The ZF S6-37 is a 6-speed manual transmission manufactured by ZF Friedrichshafen AG.

Gear ratios (37BZ for gasoline-powered engines):

Gear ratios (37DZ for diesel-powered engines)

Applications
Rear-wheel-drive:

Gasoline:

GS6-37BZ — THEA 
 BMW Z4 E85 (3.0i, 3.0i (M54)) 

GS6-37BZ — TJEE 
 BMW Z4M E85/E86

GS6-37BZ — TJES 
 BMW 1 E81/E87/E87 LCI (130i) 
 BMW Z4 E85/E86 (3.0si)

GS6-37BZ — TJEP 
 BMW 120i E87
 BMW 3 Series 330i E90 (N52)/330i E91 (N52)/330i E92 (N52N)
 BMW 5 Series 530i E60 (N52)/530i E61 (530i) 
 BMW 6 Series E63/E64 (630i)

GS6-37BZ — THEG 
 BMW E46 (325ti, 330i/Ci) 
 BMW E60 (520i, 525i (M54), 530i (M54)) 
 BMW E61 (525i)

Diesel:

GS6-37DZ — TJEF
 BMW E81/E82/E87 LCI/E88 (120d) 
 BMW E90 (320d, 320d N47) 
 BMW E90 LCI/E91/E91 LCI (320d N47) 
 BMW E92/E93 (320d) 
 BMW E60 LCI (520d, 520d N47) 
 BMW E61 LCI (520d N47) 

GS6-37DZ — TJEJ
 BMW E81/E82/E87 LCI/E88 (120d) 
 BMW E90 (320d, 320d N47) 
 BMW E90 LCI/E91/E91 LCI (320d N47) 
 BMW E92/E93 (320d)
 BMW X1 sDrive20d E84 (N47) 

GS6-37DZ — TJEM
 BMW E87 (118d, 120d) 
 BMW 320Cd E46 
 BMW E90/E91 (318d (M47N2), 320d (M47N2)) 

 BMW E60/E61 (520d) 

 BMW E60 LCI/E61 LCI (520d (M47N2)) 

GS6-37DZ — THES
 BMW 120d E87 
 BMW E46 (320Cd/td, 320d (M47N)) 
 BMW E90/E91 (320d M47N2) 
 BMW E60/E61 (520d)

All-wheel-drive:

Gasoline:

GS6X37BZ — TJEN 
 BMW E90 (325xi, 325xi (N52), 325xi (N52N), 325xi (N53), 328xi N51, 328xi (N52N), 330xi, 330xi (N52), 330xi (N53)) 
 BMW E90 LCI (325xi, 325xi (N52N), 325xi (N53), 328xi (N51), 328xi (N52N) 30xi) 
 BMW E91 (325xi, 325xi (N52), 325xi (N52N), 325xi (N53), 328xi, 330xi (N52), 330xi (N53)) 
 BMW E91 LCI (325xi (N52N), 325xi (N53), 328xi, 330xi) 
 BMW E92 (325xi (N52N), 325xi (N53), 328xi (N51), 328xi (N52N), 330xi (N52N), 330xi (N53)) 
 BMW E92 LCI (325xi (N52N), 325xi (N53), 328xi (N51), 328xi (N52N), 330xi) 

GS6X37BZ — THEW 
 BMW 330xi E46 

GS6X37BZ — TJEO 
 BMW E60/E61 (525xi, 530xi) 
 BMW E60 LCI (525xi, 528xi, 530xi, 530xi (N52N), 530xi (N53)) 
 BMW E61 LCI (525xi, 530xi (N52N), 530xi (N53)) 
 BMW X3 E83 LCI (2.5si, 3.0i, 3.0si). 

GS6X37BZ — THRH 
 BMW X3 E83/LCI (2.0i) 

GS6X37BZ — THET 
 BMW X3 E83 (2.5i, 3.0i) 

GS6X37BZ — THRF
 BMW X3 E83 LCI (2.5si, 3.0i, 3.0si). 

GS6X37BZ — THEX 
 BMW X5 3.0i E53 

Diesel models: 

GS6X37DZ — TJEU 
 BMW E90 LCI/E91 LCI (320xd N47) 
 BMW E92 320xd 
 BMW X1 E84 (18dX (N47), 20dX (N47)).

GS6X37DZ — THRD / THRJ 
 BMW X3 2.0d E83 
 BMW X3 2.0d E83 LCI (M47N2). 

GS6X37DZ — THRG 
 BMW X3 E83 LCI (1.8d, 2.0d, 2.0d (N47)).

References
http://www.zf.com/corporate/en/products/product_range/cars/cars_manual_6_speed_transmission.shtml
http://www.bmwclub.lv/files/05_E85_Driveline.pdf
https://www.bimmerfest.ru/korobka-peredach-gs6-37/

S6-37